Sprinkling can refer to:

Aspersion, a method of baptism, particularly used for infant baptism.
Sprinkling, a type of character in the video game Viva Piñata.
Sprinkling is a method of creating a causal set from a Lorentzian manifold.